Wild Poses is short subject in the Our Gang (The Little Rascals) series.
It was produced and directed by Robert F. McGowan for Hal Roach Studios and first released on October 28, 1933 by Metro-Goldwyn-Mayer. It was the 125th Our Gang short that was released.

A sequel to the previous Our Gang short, Bedtime Worries, Wild Poses features a brief cameo by Laurel & Hardy.

Plot 
Otto Phocus (Franklin Pangborn) is a haughty photographer hellbent on taking a formal portrait of a terrified Spanky (George McFarland). The little guy has been told by the gang that Phocus plans to "shoot" him; thinking the camera is a cannon. This leads Spanky to avoid having his picture taken, and his habit of punching Phocus in the face with regularity.

Phocus serves as Spanky's foil in other ways as well. He tries to get Spanky to pose with an exaggerated sweet smile on his face; when Spanky sees Phocus' ridiculous grimace he turns to his Dad (Emerson Treacy) and says, "Hey Pop, do you see what I see?" Later, when Spanky's friends have filled the rubber shutter bulb with water, and Phocus squeezes it, squirting Spanky's Dad with water, his Mom (Gay Seabrook) tells Spanky, "That's how they take watercolor pictures."
Finally, after having successfully taken Spanky's picture, Phocus discovers the gang exposed his photographic plates, rendering "all my lovely work for nothing!". Spanky responds to the photographers request for "one more bust" with a punch in the nose before his family leaves the studio in disgust.

Cast

The Gang
 George McFarland as Spanky
 Matthew Beard as Stymie
 Tommy Bond as Tommy
 Jerry Tucker as Jerry
 Georgie Billings as Darby

Additional cast
 Gay Seabrook as Gay, Spanky's mother
 Emerson Treacy as Emerson, Spanky's father
 Franklin Pangborn as Otto Phocus, the portrait photographer
 Georgie Billings as Georgie
 Stan Laurel and Oliver Hardy as Babies
 George Stevens, Jr. as Role unknown (scenes deleted)

Laurel and Hardy cameo 
At the beginning of the film, a salesman is seen soliciting Otto Phocus' services throughout a residential neighborhood. At one home, he tells a housewife that she has "two of the most photogenic children" he has ever seen.

The camera cuts to reveal the woman's two children, portrayed in a brief cameo by Laurel and Hardy, dressed in baby clothes and using giant sets from their short Brats (1930). Laurel and Hardy briefly fight over a baby bottle, until Laurel eye-pokes Hardy and emerges victorious as the scene transitions to set the main plot in motion.

Notes
Wild Poses was the last Our Gang short directed by Robert McGowan until 1936's Divot Diggers. The entire film employs background music again, now a mix of Leroy Shield recordings and other studio recordings. The film was done with a feel of a sitcom and focuses again around Spanky. The depleted gang, now only three children (Georgie Billings plays a kid Darby who is with his mom and not part of the gang) basically is in the background throughout the episode, though unlike Bedtime Worries, they do not appear to be homeless.

See also
 Our Gang filmography

References

External links 
 
 
 

1933 films
1933 comedy films
American black-and-white films
Films directed by Robert F. McGowan
Hal Roach Studios short films
Our Gang films
Films with screenplays by H. M. Walker
1933 short films
1930s English-language films
1930s American films